Arun Vishnu (born 2 August 1988) is an Indian badminton player, from Calicut, Kerala, who represents India in several international tournaments. He is partnering with Aparna Balan and Alwin Francis in mixed doubles category and men's doubles category respectively. His career best world ranking is 37 and 41 in men's doubles and mixed doubles category respectively.

Career 
Arun started playing badminton at the age of 12 under Kerala Sports Council Coach A. Nazer. He trained at Gopichand Badminton Academy in Hyderabad under the guidance of Pullela Gopichand.

Arun Vishnu and Aparna Balan are Indian National Badminton Champion in Mixed Doubles category in 2011, 2012, 2013, 2014 & 2015. He and Tarun Kona are Indian National Badminton Champion in Men's Doubles category in 2011.

He has represented India in World Badminton Championships 2015, 2014, 2013 & 2009, Asian Games 2010, Asian Badminton Championships 2016, 2015, 2013, 2012, 2011 & 2010, Sudirman Cup 2015, 2013, 2011 & 2009, Thomas Cup 2014. In the Indian Badminton League 2013, Arun played for the Pune Pistons.

As a Coach, Vishnu guided Chennai Smashers to Premier Badminton League 2017 title on his maiden assignment as Coach. He  was coach of Indian Badminton Team at the big events like Commonwealth Games 2022, World Badminton Championship 2021 & 2022, Thomas & Uber Cup 2021, Badminton Asia Championship 2022 and Asian Games 2018. Currently he trains Treesa Jolly & Gayatri Gopichand in Indian National Badminton Camp.

Achievements

BWF Grand Prix 
The BWF Grand Prix had two levels, the BWF Grand Prix and Grand Prix Gold. It was a series of badminton tournaments sanctioned by the Badminton World Federation (BWF) which was held from 2007 to 2017.

  BWF Grand Prix Gold tournament
  BWF Grand Prix tournament

BWF International 

  BWF International Challenge tournament
  BWF International Series tournament
  BWF Future Series tournament

Family
In 2016 January, Arun Vishnu married Nagpur native badminton player Arundhati Pantawane.

References

External links 
 
 

1988 births
Living people
Indian male badminton players
Badminton players at the 2010 Asian Games
Racket sportspeople from Kozhikode
Asian Games competitors for India